Claude Eugène Hippolyte Bourgeois (March 12, 1818 - August 28, 1847) was a French dramatist and writer.

Bourgeois was born in Morlaix.  He is remembered today for collaborating with Émile Souvestre on the play Le Pasteur ou l'Évangile et le foyer, which was adapted by Francesco Maria Piave into the libretto for Giuseppe Verdi's Stiffelio.  He collaborated with Souvestre on two other works as well, and also wrote a few works on his own.  He died, aged 29, at Penzé-en-Taulé.

People from Morlaix
1818 births
1847 deaths
19th-century French dramatists and playwrights